Nitrate reductase (NAD(P)H) (assimilatory nitrate reductase, assimilatory NAD(P)H-nitrate reductase, NAD(P)H bispecific nitrate reductase, nitrate reductase (reduced nicotinamide adenine dinucleotide (phosphate)), nitrate reductase NAD(P)H, NAD(P)H-nitrate reductase, nitrate reductase [NAD(P)H2], NAD(P)H2:nitrate oxidoreductase) is an enzyme with systematic name nitrite:NAD(P)+ oxidoreductase. This enzyme catalises the following chemical reaction

 nitrite + NAD(P)+ + H2O  nitrate + NAD(P)H + H+

Nitrate reductase is an iron-sulfur molybdenum flavoprotein.

References

External links 
 

EC 1.7.1